Save the World is the third studio album by American gospel singer Yolanda Adams. It was released by Tribute and Benson Records on October 19, 1993, in the United States.

Track listing 
This Joy (4:27)
The Battle Is The Lord's (4:23)
Real Love (4:40)
Ye Of Little Faith (5:11)
Let Us Worship Him (3:35)
Save The World (4:35)
Right Now (4:20)
I'll Always Remember (5:18)
Give It To Him (4:57)
Before I Tell Them (3:30)

Charts

External links
 

1993 albums
Yolanda Adams albums